Tasnim Mir (born 13 May 2005) is an Indian badminton player. She is a former BWF World Junior Number 1.

Early life
Mir was born in Mehsana, where her father Irfan Ali Mir worked in the police department. He was also a badminton coach, and introduced Mir to the sport when she was seven or eight years old. When twelve, she stopped attending daily classes in school to focus on badminton training.

Career

2018
Mir won the U-15 singles and doubles titles at national sub-junior tournaments in Hyderabad and Nagpur in January and July 2018 respectively. In October of that year, she again won an U15 title and then the U17 title as well. The following year, she broke through the domestic junior ranks by winning the national U-19 girls' title while still 14 years of age. In 2018, Mir also played her first international event, the Badminton Asia Junior U17 and U15 Championships, in Mandalay, Myanmar. While she lost in the quarter finals in the U15 singles event, she partnered Meghana Reddy to win the gold in the U15 doubles.

2019
In 2019, she excelled at the Badminton Asia Junior U17 and U15 Championships held in Surabaya, Indonesia, winning the U15 singles crown. Besides, she won the singles and mixed doubles titles in the Dubai Junior International Series, and got to the quarter final stage of the Korea Junior Open International Challenge.

2020
In 2020, she earned a bronze at the Dutch Junior International.

2021
Mir represented India at the 2020 Thomas & Uber Cup held in October 2021 in Aarhus, Denmark. She won one and lost one of her two singles matches in the group stage.

2022
Mir claimed the women's title at the India International Challenge badminton tournament in Raipur, Chhattisgarh in September 2022, upsetting several seeded players on her path to the win.

Mir trained briefly at the Gopichand Badminton Academy in 2018, before making the move to Guwahati where she is coached by Edwin Iriawan at the Assam Badminton Academy.

Achievements

BWF International Challenge/Series (2 titles, 1 runner-up) 
Women's singles

  BWF International Challenge tournament
  BWF International Series tournament
  BWF Future Series tournament

BWF Junior International (6 titles, 1 runner-up) 
Girls' singles

Mixed doubles

  BWF Junior International Grand Prix tournament
  BWF Junior International Challenge tournament
  BWF Junior International Series tournament
  BWF Junior Future Series tournament

Performance timeline

National team 
 Senior level

Individual competitions 
 Senior level

Awards and recognition

Others 
 Sportstar Emerging Hero Award 2022

References

External links 
 

Living people
2005 births
People from Gujarat
Racket sportspeople from Gujarat
Indian female badminton players
21st-century Indian women